Quinestradol (brand names Colpovis, Colpovister, Pentovis), also known as quinestradiol or quinestriol, as well as estriol 3-cyclopentyl ether (E3CPE), is a synthetic estrogen and estrogen ether which is no longer marketed. It is the 3-cyclopentyl ether of estriol. The medication has been studied in the treatment of stress incontinence in elderly women, with effectiveness observed.

See also
 List of estrogens
 List of estrogen esters § Ethers of steroidal estrogens

References

Abandoned drugs
Cyclopentyl ethers
Diols
Estranes
Estrogen ethers
Phenols
Synthetic estrogens
Triols